A non-binding referendum on same-sex marriage was held in Bermuda on 23 June 2016. Voters were asked two questions; whether they were in favour of same-sex marriages and whether they are in favour of same-sex civil unions. While majority of voters voted against both proposals, the results were invalid as the turnout of 46.89% was below the 50% requirement.

Opinion polls
A Global Research poll, conducted between 6 and 13 June 2016 for The Royal Gazette, found that 49% of registered voters opposed same-sex marriage, 41% were in favour and 10% did not know. A separate question on the same survey found that 52% supported civil unions for same-sex couples, 39% were against and 9% did not know.

Results

See also
 Same-sex marriage in Bermuda
 LGBT rights in Bermuda

References

Same-sex union and marriage referendum
2016
Bermudian same-sex union and marriage referendum
Bermudian same-sex union and marriage referendum
LGBT rights in Bermuda
Bermudian same-sex union and marriage referendum
Same-sex marriage referendums
Recognition of same-sex unions in North America